Vitz-sur-Authie is a commune in the Somme department in Hauts-de-France in northern France.

Geography

History
Also known as Vitz-lès-Willancourt, the commune was once the seigneurie of the d'Abbeville family.

Population

See also
Communes of the Somme department

References

Communes of Somme (department)